Woodlawn Heights is a neighborhood in Anderson Township, Madison County, Indiana, United States. It is part of the Anderson, Indiana Metropolitan Statistical Area. The population was 79 at the 2010 census.

Geography
Woodlawn Heights is located at  (40.118429, -85.695566).

Demographics

2010 census
At the 2010 census there were 79 people, 34 households, and 26 families living in the town. The racial makeup of the town was 97.5% White, 1.3% from other races, and 1.3% from two or more races. Hispanic or Latino of any race were 3.8%.

Of the 34 households 26.5% had children under the age of 18 living with them, 70.6% were married couples living together, 5.9% had a male householder with no wife present, and 23.5% were non-families. 20.6% of households were one person and 8.8% were one person aged 65 or older. The average household size was 2.32 and the average family size was 2.69.

The median age in the town was 56.3 years. 19% of residents were under the age of 18; 1.3% were between the ages of 18 and 24; 19.1% were from 25 to 44; 38.1% were from 45 to 64; and 22.8% were 65 or older. The gender makeup of the town was 45.6% male and 54.4% female.

2000 census
At the 2000 census there were 73 people, 33 households, and 26 families living in the town. The racial makeup of the town was 100.00% White.
Of the 33 households 18.2% had children under the age of 18 living with them, 81.8% were married couples living together, and 18.2% were non-families. 15.2% of households were one person and 6.1% were one person aged 65 or older. The average household size was 2.21 and the average family size was 2.44.

The age distribution was 12.3% under the age of 18, 2.7% from 18 to 24, 12.3% from 25 to 44, 50.7% from 45 to 64, and 21.9% 65 or older. The median age was 54 years. For every 100 females, there were 87.2 males. For every 100 females age 18 and over, there were 88.2 males.

The median household income was $111,324 and the median family income  was $151,837. Males had a median income of $0 versus $48,438 for females. The per capita income for the town was $66,385. There were no families and 5.7% of the population living below the poverty line, including no under eighteens and none of those over 64.

References

Towns in Madison County, Indiana
Towns in Indiana